Caimbambo is a town and municipality in Benguela Province in Angola. The municipality had a population of 90,838 in 2014.

The town was founded on September 1, 1921, and head as first council chief António Rodrigues.

References

Populated places in Benguela Province
Municipalities of Angola
1921 establishments in the Portuguese Empire